Langlands School and College, in Chitral, North-West Pakistan, formerly known as Sayurj Public School, was the first community based public school controlled under the district administration in the remote district. In the beginning the school was managed and controlled by the board of governors and the deputy commissioner of the district the deputy commissioner was also chairmen of the board of governors.but still the status of the school is not clear. Today it educates about a thousand pupils, aged from four to eighteen, on four separate sites in and above the town of Chitral. More than a third of the pupils are girls, and the school has a record of academic excellence. The best students have gone on to scholarships in Lahore, doctorates in Australia and exchange programmes in America. Although private, school fees are very low, even by local standards.

The school was founded in 1988 as a school for boys and girls aged five to ten years old. The following year, former British major Geoffrey D Langlands arrived to take over as headmaster. He, who had been a teacher in mathematics in Croydon before World War II, had arrived in British India on a troop carrier in 1944, and remained when India and Pakistan became independent nations; first as an instructor for the young Pakistani army for six years; and from 1953 as a teacher at Aitchison College in Lahore, Pakistan's answer to Eton College, where he taught pupils like Zafarullah Khan Jamali and Imran Khan. In 1979 he left Aitchison College for a position as headmaster of Cadet College Razmak, in North Waziristan, where he stayed until he was offered to take over the running of the school in Chitral.

When Langlands arrived in 1989, the school had 80 pupils, from nursery school to Class 4, and six female teachers, but under his direction the school grew quickly, with a new class added each year. Today, the school  In 1993 he recruited the first male teachers, to teach science subjects. Today, the majority of teachers in the senior school are men.

From the start, Langlands was a staunch advocate of education for girls in Chitral, insisting on teaching them up to the age of eighteen. He encountered stiff opposition to this, but eventually convinced local leaders that society needed educated women. Girls are taught separately in the senior school, but they enjoy access to all the school's facilities.

After suffering a stroke in 2008, the then 91-year-old Langlands started to contemplate retirement, and in September 2012, leadership of the school was transferred from the 94-year-old founder to 58-year-old British woman Carey Schofield, a foreign correspondent for London based newspapers for several decades and author of several books on military matters, among them Inside the Pakistan Army (2011).

Upset that the new principal reported the real state of the school to trustees. He went to the Minister of Interior without the knowledge of the Trustees or Governors and persuaded Mr. Chaudhary Nisar Ali Khan (his old Aitchison pupil) to block her visa. Mr Langlands attempted to seize control of the school and its bank accounts, pretending to be the owner and founder of the school.

The issue became public in Pakistan with questions raised in the Senate over Major Langlands behaviour. The Senate supported Schofield, as did the Governors and parents. The teachers of the school supported Schofield and all travelled to Lahore to berate Langlands for his unseemly conduct.

Carey Schofield returned to Chitral in January 2016 to take up the helm again.

References

External links 
 Friends of Langlands School
 The school's Facebook page
 BBC News, 6 August 2010: Audio slideshow: The major's school

Private schools in Pakistan
Schools in Khyber Pakhtunkhwa
Chitral
1988 establishments in Pakistan